Gardman, also known as Gardmank, was one of the eight cantons of the ancient province of Utik in the Kingdom of Armenia and simultaneously, together with the canton of Tuchkatak, an Armenian principality. It roughly corresponded within the Gazakh, Shamkir, Aghstafa, Dashkasan, Goygol, Tovuz, Gadabay districts of modern-day Azerbaijan and the original Tavush Region of Armenia. Gardman was also the name of the central fortress of the canton.

History
In prehistoric times Gardman was the homeland of the proto-Armenian tribe Gardman. Contemporary Armenian authors referred to the historical area of Gardman as Northern Artsakh. During the reign of the Arshakuni kings of Armenia (66–428 A.D.), Gardman was the seat of the nakharars of Utik'. For this reason, it was sometimes called "Gardmantsvots ishkhanutyun", or the principality of Gardman. Gardman was acquired by Caucasian Albania in 387 following the partition of Armenia. In the seventh century the local house of Gardman was replaced by the Mihranid family (of Persian or Parthian origin), which later became the ruling dynasty in the region of Arran. 

The region was conquered by the Arabs in 855. Contemporary Armenian historians repeatedly noted the presence of two well known venues in Gardman: a fortress called Getabakk' (in the current-day Azerbaijani region of Gadabay) and a copper mine.

In 982, Gardman and Parisos, the northern district of Artsakh, became the small Armenian kingdom of Parisos, which lasted until 1017 and thereafter became part of the Kingdom of Lori. In 1601, the princely family of Melik-Shahnazaryan established the melikdom of Gardman. The ruling family belonged to a branch of the House of Khachen, and their residence was in the village of Voskanapat (and for this reason, the statelet was sometimes referred to as the Voskanapat melikdom). The territorial rights of the meliks were confirmed after the Russian Empire took control of the region in the early nineteenth century.

References

Bibliography

 
 
 

Former regions of Armenia
Historical regions in Azerbaijan
Caucasian Albania
Ancient Armenia
Ancient history of Azerbaijan